Sternbergia schubertii is a rare and quite possibly extinct flowering plant species known only from one specimen collected in Izmir, Turkey, in 1839.

References

Amaryllidoideae
Plants described in 1840
Flora of Turkey